Synuchidius ganglbaueri is a species of beetle in the family Carabidae, the only species in the genus Synuchidius.

References

Platyninae